Erwin Campbell Surrency (1924–2012) was the founder of The American Journal of Legal History.

Surrency was born in Jesup, Georgia. He attended Georgia Peabody College and the University of Georgia. From 1950 to 1978, he was the Law librarian at Temple University, and was professor of law there from 1951 to 1972. From 1979 to 1995, he was the Law librarian and professor of law at the University of Georgia.  Surrency was the author of several books.  In 2012, Erwin C. Surrency was inducted into the American Association of Law Libraries Hall of Fame.

References

External links
 AALL Hall of Fame, Erwin C. Surrency
 Worldcat collection & bio, Erwin C. Surrency
 Worldcat bibliography, Erwin C. Surrency
 Erwin C. Surrency ALA Archives
 History of the federal courts, Erwin C. Surrency

Legal historians
1924 births
2012 deaths
Academic journal editors
Law librarians
University of Georgia alumni
Temple University people